Michael R. Perry (born April 15, 1963 in Columbus, Ohio) is an American television producer, television writer and screenwriter. .

His television credits include Eerie, Indiana, New York Undercover, American Gothic, The Practice, Millennium, Law & Order: Special Victims Unit (including the episode "Limitations" for which he won the Edgar Allan Poe Award for Best Episode in a TV Series), FreakyLinks, The Guardian, The Dead Zone, House M.D., Persons Unknown, Altered Carbon (TV series), Sweet Tooth, The River (a series he co-created) and NYPD Blue for which he won a Primetime Emmy Award for Outstanding Writing for a Drama Series.

As a screenwriter he wrote the film The Voices and co-wrote the film Paranormal Activity 2.

Filmography 

 The Voices (2014)
 Paranormal Activity 2 (2010)

Television 
 Sweet Tooth (2021)
 Altered Carbon (2020)
 Wayward Pines (2016)
 Into the Badlands (2015)
 The River (2012)
 Persons Unknown (2010)
 The Dead Zone (2004-2005)
 The Guardian (2001-2003)
 FreakyLinks (2000-2001)
 Law & Order: Special Victims Unit (1999-2001)
 Millennium (1997-1999)
 The Practice (1997-1998)
 NYPD Blue (1996-1997)
 American Gothic (1995-1996)
 New York Undercover (1995)
 Eerie, Indiana (1991-1992)

References

External links 

USC School of Cinematic Arts alumni
1963 births
American male screenwriters
Television producers from Ohio
American television writers
Edgar Award winners
Primetime Emmy Award winners
Emmy Award winners
Living people
Businesspeople from Columbus, Ohio
American male television writers
Screenwriters from Ohio